Shevgaon Assembly constituency is one of the 288 Vidhan Sabha (legislative assembly) constituencies of Maharashtra state, western India. This constituency is located in Ahmednagar district. There are total 379 booth in this constituency.

Geographical scope
The constituency comprises Pathardi Municipal Council, Takali Manur and Pathardi belonging to Pathardi taluka and Shevgaon taluka.

Representatives
 1995 - Pandurang Gamaji Abhang, of INC
 1999 - Narendra Marutravji Ghule Patil, of NCP 
 2004 - Narendra Marutravji Ghule Patil, of NCP 
 2009 - Chandrashekhar Marutravji Ghule Patil, of NCP
 2014 - Monika Rajiv Rajale,  Bharatiya Janata Party
 2019 - Monika Rajiv Rajale, Bharatiya Janata Party

Election Results

References

Assembly constituencies of Maharashtra
Ahmednagar district